Gardiner Place Historic District is a national historic district located at Walton in Delaware County, New York. The district contains three contributing buildings.  They are the Village Hall, Ogden Free Library, and the separately listed U.S. Post Office.

It was listed on the National Register of Historic Places in 1984.

Gallery

See also
National Register of Historic Places listings in Delaware County, New York

References

National Register of Historic Places in Delaware County, New York
Historic districts on the National Register of Historic Places in New York (state)
Historic districts in Delaware County, New York